Heliomeris longifolia is a North American species of flowering plants in the family Asteraceae called the longleaf false goldeneye. It is widespread across much of Mexico from Chihuahua and Sonora south to Chiapas, and found also in the southwestern United States from Nevada to western Texas.

One plant can produce 25 or more yellow flower heads, each head with 12-14 ray flowers surrounding 50 or more tiny disc flowers.

Varieties
Heliomeris longifolia var. annua (M.E.Jones) W.F.Yates 
Heliomeris longifolia var. longifolia

References

External links
Photo of herbarium specimen at Missouri Botanical Garden, collected in Mexico in 1879, isotype of Heliomeris longifolia
Czech Botany, hvězdnicovité in Czech with photos

Heliantheae
Flora of Mexico
Flora of the Southwestern United States
Plants described in 1899